John Francis Cowan (December 29, 1858 – November 25, 1917) was a prominent North Dakota lawyer, politician, Attorney General, and judge. While serving as the Judge of the Second Judicial District of North Dakota, Cowan became the first person in state history to face impeachment charges.

Early life 
John F. Cowan was born on December 29, 1858, in Moffat, Scotland. In 1862, he immigrated to Ontario, Canada, with his family. Cowan graduated from the Ottawa Normal School, and then studied medicine at the College of Physicians and Surgeons of Ontario. 

He immigrated to the United States in 1880, settling in Port Huron, Michigan. There, he worked as a clerk for the Chicago & Grand Trunk Railroad Company. In 1881, he came to North Dakota (Dakota Territory at the time) and settled in Nelson County. Cowan later moved to Devils Lake, and he later worked at the law office of John McGee.

Career 
In 1884, Cowan was elected justice of the peace in Devils Lake. In 1885, he was admitted to practice law before the Territorial District Court and opened his own law office. Cowan later formed the Cowan & McClory firm with P. J. McClory. In 1886, Cowan was elected to the office of superintendent of schools for Ramsey County and was reelected in 1888. In 1890, Cowan was elected as State’s Attorney of Ramsey County, and served in that role until 1894.

Attorney General 
In 1894, John Cowan was elected Attorney General of North Dakota, after becoming the Republican candidate. Cowan campaigned throughout the state and gained a reputation as a notable orator. Cowan served as North Dakota's Attorney General until 1900, when he decided not to seek reelection again.

District Judge 
After stepping down as North Dakota's Attorney General, Cowan returned to Devils Lake. In 1901, he was elected Judge of the Second Judicial District. He served in this role until 1912. In 1911, during his time as a district judge, Cowan became the first person in state history to face impeachment charges.

Impeachment 
For the first time in state history, in 1911, the North Dakota House of Representatives filed articles of impeachment against Cowan and forwarded them to the Senate. 

The allegations against Judge Cowan included things like habitual drunkenness, frequenting establishments where intoxicating liquors were sold (North Dakota was a "dry state" at the time), engaging in disorderly and boisterous conduct, speaking lewd and obscene words, assaulting a woman by attempting to forcibly kiss her, dismissing or ignoring motions and cases, deceiving the auditor, influencing jurors, intimidating attorneys, and sleeping during trials.

On May 4, 1911, after a month of hearings, the Senate found Cowan not guilty on all charges.

Death 
The impeachment trial hurt Cowan personally, politically, and physically. In 1912, he lost his district judge reelection campaign to C.W. Buttz, and he returned to his Devils Lake law practice. In the following years, his health began to fail. At the age of 58, he died in Rochester, Minnesota on November 25, 1917.

John F. Cowan is buried in Saint Joseph's Catholic Cemetery in Devils Lake.

Personal life 
In 1885, Cowan married Mary Flynn of Henderson, Minnesota.

Political offices 
 Devils Lake Justice of the Peace
 Superintendent of Schools for Ramsey County
 State's Attorney for Ramsey County
 Attorney General of North Dakota
 Judge of the Second Judicial District of North Dakota

See also
List of attorneys general of North Dakota
North Dakota Attorney General

References

External links 
 

1858 births
1917 deaths
North Dakota Attorneys General
19th-century politicians
North Dakota Republicans